The 2021 'A' Division National Futsal League was the first season of the 'A' Division National Futsal League, the top flight based club futsal league of Nepal. A total of ten teams qualified in the tournament from 18 September to 8 October 2021. Sports Castle Pokhara were crowned as the league winners after defeating Sankhamul Futsal in the final by 4-2.

Background
All Nepal Football Association ANFA announced the creation of 'A' Division Futsal League on 25 January 2021. A total of 10 teams, two teams from Province 1 and Gandaki Province, one from Province 2, for from Bagmati Province and one team representing Lumbini, Karnali and Sudurpashim provinces, takes part in the competition organized by ANFA Futsal Committee.

Qualification round was completed in Province 1 on 16 March. Eight teams participated for two slots in 'A' Division Futsal League. In the final, Futsal 5 Dharan defeated The Rising Club Dharan 5–4 in penalty shootout, after the match ended on 4–4 in regular time. Both team qualified for the 'A' division Futsal League.

Qualification round was completed for Lumbini, Karnali and Sudurpaschim Province on 3 April. Eight teams participated for one slot in 'A' Division Futsal League. In the final, Lumbini Futsal defeated Jharna Sports Club 7–2. Lumbini Futsal qualified for the 'A' division Futsal League.

Qualification round was completed in Bagmati Province on 11 April. Thirty-two teams participated for four slots in 'A' Division Futsal League. In the final, Dhuku Futsal Hub defeated Sankhamul Futsal 8–2 to win the qualifier. Four teams; both the finalist and Prabhatpheri Youth Club and Machhindra Sky Goals were qualified for the 'A' division Futsal League.

Qualification round was completed for Gandaki Province on 18 April. Eight teams participated for two slots in 'A' Division Futsal League. In the final, Sports Castle Pokhara defeated Sabin Memorial FC 3–2 in penalty shootout as game ended 2–2 in regular time. Both Finalist qualified for the 'A' division Futsal League.

Although the plan was to conduct a Province 2 qualifier, due to the technical reasons, the qualifier was cancelled and the remaining slot was given to Jharna Sports Club

Venue
All matches were held at the Pokhara Multipurpose Covered Hall in Pokhara, Nepal.

Teams

Personnels

League stage

League table

Results

Round robin

Playoffs

Bracket

Preliminary

Final

Season Statistics

Top Scorer

Hattrick

Discipline

Player

 Most yellow cards: 4
 Saroj Tamang (Futsal 5 Dharan)

 Most red cards: 2
 Dhiraj Tamang (Futsal 5 Dharan)

Club

 Most yellow cards: 18
Sankhamul Futsal

 Most red cards: 4
Futsal 5 Dharan

Awards

End-of-season awards

References

National futsal leagues
N
Nepal
N